Boryana Dineva Straubel (May 25, 1983 – June 19, 2021) was a Bulgarian businesswoman and philanthropist who emigrated to the United States. She managed a family foundation that focused on environmental sustainability. She founded a jewelry company, Generation Collection, to promote environmental sustainability through the recycling of metals. She was a manager in human resources at Tesla, the electric car company. She married Tesla executive J. B. Straubel in 2013. In 2015, she became the vice president of human resources for the Wikimedia Foundation for one year. As she was bicycling in a designated lane in Nevada in June 2021, a car crossed the center line and struck her, killing her instantly.

Early life and education 
Boryana Dineva was born in Mezdra, Bulgaria. She was raised by a single mother. From a very young age, the value of hard work was instilled in her. She graduated from high school as class valedictorian in 2000.

After the fall of the Berlin Wall in 1989, her family migrated to Germany, where they lived in a refugee camp for a few months. Afterwards she lived in Austria and Russia. Straubel was passionate about math. She was shy and preferred surfing the internet than going out with friends. She moved to the United States in 2005.

Straubel studied at the Silicon Valley College of San Mateo and graduated in 2008. She studied at the University of California, Berkeley where she got a B.S. in Economics. In 2019 and 2020, she obtained a Management Science & Engineering Master's degree and an MBA at Stanford University.

Career
Straubel worked as account manager for the software company Brocade. From 2011 to 2015, she worked in Human Resources, Operations and Data Analysis at Tesla. During those four years and a half the employee count went from 600 to 13,000 due to an exponential growth of the company.

Straubel led the Human Resources Analytics, Information Systems, and Operation groups. She was instrumental in building the company's people analytics capacity and developing a data-driven organizational design to support growth. She was instrumental in creating the Tesla culture that she summarised as

From 2015 to 2016, Straubel was VP of Human Resources for the Wikimedia Foundation. She oversaw the Wikimedia Foundation's talent and culture function, including talent acquisition, organizational training and development, and talent management and people analytics. She reported to Wikimedia Foundation Chief Operating Officer Terence Gilbey.

From March 2016 to July 2017 Straubel was Program Director at Tesla. She left Tesla to study at Stanford University where she got a M.S. in Management Sloan (2019) and M.S. in Management Science and Engineering (2020) by the Stanford's School of Engineering.

Straubel Foundation 

The Straubel Foundation's goal is to help accelerate the transition to a more environmentally sustainable future. Since 2015, J. B. Straubel has been the president of the Straubel Foundation. Boryana Straubel was an executive director until her death in 2021. The Straubel Foundation is focused on leadership, impact investments, and education.

Personal life
On August 3, 2013, Boryana Dineva Straubel married  Jeffrey Brian ("JB") Straubel and lived in Woodside, California. In 2015, she gave birth to twins. When JB Straubel left as CTO at Tesla in July 2019, they moved to Nevada, where Redwood Materials was located.

Death
Straubel died after being hit by a car on Saturday June 19, 2021, while riding her bike. The driver was unlicensed.

References

External links 
 Boryana Straubel in Youtube
 Straubel Foundation

1983 births
2021 deaths
21st-century Bulgarian businesspeople
21st-century Bulgarian women
21st-century women philanthropists
Bulgarian emigrants to the United States
Bulgarian philanthropists
Bulgarian women in business
College of San Mateo alumni
Jewelry retailers of the United States
People from Mezdra
Road incident deaths in Nevada
Stanford University School of Engineering alumni
Tesla, Inc. people
University of California, Berkeley alumni
Wikimedia Foundation staff members
Cycling road incident deaths